Uzungulovo (Oźongül) is a rural locality (a village) in Mindyaksky Selsoviet, Uchalinsky District, Bashkortostan, Russia. The population was 198 as of 2010. There are 8 streets.

Geography 
Uzungulovo is located 76 km southwest of Uchaly (the district's administrative centre) by road. Ozyorny is the nearest rural locality.

References 

Rural localities in Uchalinsky District